The Capitol Polo Club is a polo club in Poolesville, Maryland.

Location
The club is located at 14460 Hughes Road in Poolesville, Maryland, thirty miles northwest of Washington, D.C.

History
The club was founded in 2006. It holds the Green Polo Cup, an annual charity tournament. According to its website, its aim is to "protect[ing] the environment and fight climate change." In 2009, proceeds went to American Council on Renewable Energy (ACORE), Equestrian Partners in Conservation (EPIC) and EarthEcho International. It has also benefited KIDSAVE, a non-profit organization.

The President of the club is Dr. Robert T. Do, Chairman of the Solena Group.

References

Polo clubs in the United States
Montgomery County, Maryland
2006 establishments in Maryland